Kupa is spoken in villages in Kupaland which are Abugi, Ikin-Sami circus of villages (Kapu, Agini, Buzhi, etc), Ikin-makun circles, Kuchalu, Sampi and Eggan ( all located on the southern part of the Niger River).

Kupa is under Lokoja L.G.A. It is most closely related to the Kakanda language. Koelle (1854) is a source. Egã (Eggan) village has very few Kupa speakers.

Kupa, also as a Tribe and district as its district head called the 'Maiyaki of Kupa' residing at Abugi. It has roughly 70 villages under it. 

All (*) in the list of villages are named settlements under the main village.

The entire list was according to an authentic source; MA Zakari Brainbox on Kupa-Nupe Nigeria.

References

Languages of Nigeria
Nupoid languages